Star Lake is a lake in Cook County, Minnesota, in the United States.

Star Lake was probably so named from its roughly star-like outline.

See also
List of lakes in Minnesota

References

Lakes of Minnesota
Lakes of Cook County, Minnesota